War Branch is a  long 2nd order tributary to Georges Creek in Fayette County, Pennsylvania.

Variant names
According to the Geographic Names Information System, it has also been known historically as: 
 War Branch Run

Course
War Branch rises in a pond about 0.25 miles southwest of Old Frame, Pennsylvania, and then flows south-southwest to join Georges Creek about 2.5 miles east-southeast of New Geneva.

Watershed
War Branch drains  of area, receives about 42.9 in/year of precipitation, has a wetness index of 332.74, and is about 59% forested.

See also
List of rivers of Pennsylvania

References

Rivers of Pennsylvania
Rivers of Fayette County, Pennsylvania
Allegheny Plateau